.uot refers to:

 Unified Office Format

UOT or UoT may refer to:

 University of Toronto
 University of Tennessee
 University of Tartu